Ring Games is a Jamaican television series, created in 2016. It revolves around a wealthy family living in Kingston, Jamaica. Created by Television Jamaica, it is written by Dahlia Harris.
The series is based on Ol' Fyah Stick, but with a more developed plot.

Premise
Season one of Ring Games finds Joseph Moore (Volier Johnson), a widower of 15 years, hoping to find marital bliss a second time around. His choice of companion is his domestic helper Betty (Deon Silvera), with whom he has been secretly carrying on for years. In order to make it down the aisle, Joseph needs to be honest with his daughter, Margaret (Dahlia Harris), but deep down, he knows that coming clean may permanently damage their relationship.

Throw in the meddlesome security guard, Delroy (Desmond Dennis), who has his sights set on Betty, and the diabolical neighbour, Joan (Rosie Murray), who is hell-bent on destroying the union, and the games begin.

Betty is as determined to get that ring as Margaret and Joan are to get rid of her. Joseph is smack dab in the middle, trying to hold  them at bay while trying to keep Delroy away. Intriguing drama with large servings of comedy

Cast

See also 
 List of Jamaican films

References

2010s Jamaican television series
2016 Jamaican television series debuts
Television Jamaica original programming